Farhad Hossain (born 5 June 1972) is a Bangladesh Awami League politician and the incumbent State Minister of Public Administration and Jatiya Sangsad member from Meherpur-1 constituency.

Background and early life
Hossain was born on 5 June 1972 in Meherpur District. He completed his masters in English . His father, Saheehuddin Biswas, was named MNA (Member of the National Assembly) in 1970. In addition, he was elected MP of parliamentary constituency 73 Meherpur-1 in 1973 and 1986. In 1975 he was elected as the District Governor of Bakshal. He was one of the founders of greater Kushtia District Awami League.

Career
Hossain is the president of Meherpur District unit of Awami League. He was a lecturer at the Dhaka City College.

Hossain was elected parliament member in 2014 from Meherpur-1 (Meherpur-Mujibnagar) as a candidate of the Awami League. He received 80,146 votes while independent candidate Md. Yeearul Islam received 13,919 votes. He was a member of the Parliamentary Standing Committee of the Ministry of Finance of the 10th Parliament and member of the sub-committee of the Parliamentary Standing Committee on the Ministry of Finance. He is an executive member of Muktijoddha Kalyan Trust.

Hossain was re-elected to parliament from Meherpur-1 as an Awami League candidate in 2018. He received 197,097 votes while his nearest rival, Masud Arun of the Bangladesh Nationalist Party, received 14,192 votes. On 7 January 2019, he was appointed the State Minister of Public Affairs; the first to be appointed a minister from Meherpur District.

In June 2022, Hossain said there were nearly 400 thousand vacancies in various ministries of the government. Hossain proposed the Bangladesh Public Service Commission Bill-2022" which would raise the members of the Bangladesh Public Service Commission from 15 to 20.

References

1972 births
Living people
People from Meherpur District
Awami League politicians
State Ministers of Public Administration (Bangladesh)
10th Jatiya Sangsad members
11th Jatiya Sangsad members